Tuckers Crossroads is an unincorporated community in Wilson County, Tennessee, United States. It is located at the intersection of Tennessee State Route 141, Linwood  Road, and Big Springs Road.  The community has one hair salon, one gas station (formerly known as the Linwood BP but recently bought by Marathon), two community softball fields, an elementary and middle school, three churches, many farms (including the beef cattle of Neal Farms) and rural residential housing.

Demographics

Notes

Unincorporated communities in Wilson County, Tennessee
Unincorporated communities in Tennessee